Brokenstraw Creek is a  tributary of the Allegheny River in Warren County, Pennsylvania in the United States.

Brokenstraw Creek is made up of two smaller streams:  The "Little Brokenstraw" originates south east of Panama, New York and flows south through Lottsville and Wrightsville to Pittsfield, PA.  The Brokenstraw Creek which originates near Columbus, Pennsylvania flows easterly to join the Little Brokenstraw in Pittsfield, Pennsylvania.  The resulting stream is locally known as the Big Brokenstraw.  From Pittsfield, the stream flows east through downtown Youngsville, Pennsylvania to Irvine when it meets the Allegheny River at the (old Seneca Indian village turned archaeological dig site) Buckaloons campground.  The Brokenstraw Creek-Allegheny River confluence at Buckaloons is approximately 8 miles downstream of the city of Warren and 14 miles upstream of Tidioute, Pennsylvania.

Both the big and little Brokenstraw Creeks and their tributaries boast good water quality, low levels of pollution and high dissolved oxygen content, making these streams highly sought after for fishermen, especially trout fishermen.  Brook trout are native and are commonly caught in the smaller tributaries, while the larger portions of the stream are stocked with Brown trout, Rainbow trout and Palomino (West Virginia Golden trout-Rainbow trout hybrid) trout by the Pennsylvania Fish and Boat Commission.  Many stretches of stream also hold Smallmouth bass and White suckers.  Occasionally Walleye and Northern pike are also caught in the creek.

Tributaries
Coffee Creek

See also
List of rivers of New York
List of rivers of Pennsylvania

References

External links
U.S. Geological Survey: PA stream gaging stations

Rivers of New York (state)
Rivers of Pennsylvania
Tributaries of the Allegheny River
Rivers of Warren County, Pennsylvania
Rivers of Chautauqua County, New York